The Rock of Ages Festival is a Christian music festival held every October in Calistoga, California, United States. It was established in 1999 and has grown to become one of Northern California's biggest rock festivals. The Rock of Ages Festival presents speakers and music on four stages ranging in style from rock, rap, and Reggae to punk, big band, Latino, and more. The festival also presents workshops on subjects from marriage and relationships, to creation science and local ministry.

The Rock of Ages Festival has alternative stages featuring sports shows including a skate park and pro skateboarders, BMX teams, motocross performers, sword swallowers, break dance teams, and more. In addition there is a Latino stage with Hispanic music and speakers, and a children's stage with entertainment, performances and interactive speakers featuring messages for families and kids.

The Rock of Ages Festival has many vendors featuring a multitude of wares, services and food, mission projects, opportunities to take foreign mission trips, and organizations that support sponsoring needy children of the world.

2008 lineup 

 Jeremy Camp
 MXPX
 Thousand Foot Krutch
 The Cross Movement
 Skillet
 Safe Haven
 Quimi
 Disciple
 SF Gospel Choir
 Wavorly
 Salvador
 Jaci Velasquez

2009 lineup 

 Third Day
 Martin Cantu & L-Rey
 Denver and the Mile High Orchestra
 Jeremy Camp
 Christafari
 L.G Wise
 Blood and Water
 Sphere of Fear
 Ron Luce
 SF Gospel Choir
 The Wedding
 Imisi
 Destination 7

2010 lineup 

 Newsboys
 Audio Adrenaline
 Phil Joel
 Christafari
 The Waiting Ends
 Blood and Water
 Boarders for Christ
 Chasing Truth
 Miles McPherson
 Stellar Kart
 Lisa Daggs
 Bob Smiley

2011 lineup 

 Jars of Clay
 Kutless
 Phil Joel
 Barlow Girl
 Curt Anderson
 Justin Homan
 Seventh Day Slumber
 Mark Thompson
 Blood & Water

2012 lineup 

 Peter Furler
 Phil Joel
 Lincoln Brewster
 Christafari
 Jaci Velasquez
 Superchick
 Salvador
 Asante Choir
 Jesus Mendoza
 Levi the Poet
 Maximillian
 Tim Byrne

2013 lineup 

 Kutless
 Tyler Reks
 StompTown Revival
 The Vespers 
 Christafari
 Vic Murphy
 Avion Blackman
 Lancaster
 Asante Choir
 Brian Lugue
 Embassador Skate Team
 Bill Morgan
 Levi The Poet
 Maximillian
 Tim Byrne
 Reid Sanders    
 KidStand 
 Terrrance Richman

2014 lineup

 Peter Furler
Steve Taylor & The Perfect Foil
 Rapture Ruckus
 [Christafari]
 [Phil Joel]
 The Red Roots
 [Stomp Town Revival]
 Avion Blackman
 Asante Choir
 Curtis Zackery
 * Vic Murphy
 Rabbi Eric Carlson
 Brad Butcher
 Whosoever South

2015 lineup

 NEEDTOBREATHE
 [Anthem Lights]
 [Lacey Sturm]
 [Shonlock]
 [Zealand Worship]
 [Andrew Palau]
 Marc Mero
 Georgina Verzal
 Jeff Gillman
 Jeff Devoll
 Dan Biddle
 Dave Bisbee
 xxxchurch

References

External links
 

Christian music festivals
Music festivals in California
Rock festivals in the United States
Tourist attractions in Napa County, California